Aleksey Sergeyevich Spiridonov (20 November 1951 – 9 April 1998) was a Soviet athlete who mainly competed in the men's hammer throw event. Born in Leningrad he trained at VSS Trud in Leningrad.

He competed for the Soviet Union in the 1976 Summer Olympics held in Montreal, Quebec, Canada in the hammer throw where he won the silver medal. His trainer was Oleg Kolodiy.

References

External links 
 
 

1951 births
1998 deaths
Athletes from Saint Petersburg
Russian male hammer throwers
Soviet male hammer throwers
Olympic athletes of the Soviet Union
Olympic silver medalists for the Soviet Union
Athletes (track and field) at the 1976 Summer Olympics
European Athletics Championships medalists
Medalists at the 1976 Summer Olympics
Olympic silver medalists in athletics (track and field)
Universiade medalists in athletics (track and field)
Universiade gold medalists for the Soviet Union
Medalists at the 1973 Summer Universiade
Medalists at the 1975 Summer Universiade